The High Commissioner from the United Kingdom to Brunei is the United Kingdom's foremost diplomatic representative in Brunei, and in charge of the United Kingdom's diplomatic mission in Brunei.

History 

Brunei was a British protectorate from 1888 until the state gained full independence on 1 January 1984. As fellow members of the Commonwealth of Nations, the United Kingdom and Brunei exchange High Commissioners rather than ambassadors. In 1958 the constitution was changed, the post of British Resident was abolished and the full on British High Commission for Brunei was established. Sir Dennis Charles White, who had served as high commissioner ever since the Brunei Constitution was adopted on 29 September 1959.

List of high commissioners

See also

 List of administrators of British Brunei
 Brunei–United Kingdom relations
 Foreign relations of Brunei

References

External links

British High Commission Bandar Seri Begawan

Brunei
 
Brunei and the Commonwealth of Nations
United Kingdom